The Detective is a thriller/detective novel by American author Roderick Thorp, first published hardcover in 1966. It was made into the 1968 movie of the same name, starring Frank Sinatra, as Detective Joe Leland. Billed as "an adult look at police life", The Detective went on to become one of the highest-grossing films of 1968 and one of the strongest box-office hits of Sinatra's acting career.

A sequel, Nothing Lasts Forever, was published in 1979, and was later adapted into the film Die Hard. Both books utilize the third-person narrative in their storytelling, and rely on a wealth of introspective monologuing.

Plot summary

Joe Leland, a private detective, begins investigating a case for the recently widowed Norma MacIver. Norma requests that Leland find out everything he can about her deceased husband. Norma requests Leland personally because her husband had mentioned knowing him in the past.

It turns out that Leland and Colin MacIver served in the same military unit during World War II, but at different times. Leland interviews Colin's first wife, Colin's mother, and the security guards at the track where Colin supposedly killed himself.

Norma introduces Leland to her neighbor and former therapist, Dr. Wendell Roberts. During their conversation, Wendell reveals that he knew Leland's wife Karen. It is revealed that Wendell was friends with the man with whom Karen Leland had had an affair.

As Leland's investigation deepens he uncovers evidence of corruption and murder. Eventually, Leland discovers that Colin was connected to a homicide during Leland's earlier life with the police department as a detective. During the investigation of Teddy Leikman's death, a confession was obtained from Felix Tesla, Leikman's roommate. Tesla was subsequently executed by electric chair. It turned out that Colin MacIver was the true murderer. Joe's partner, Mike Petrakis, managed to decipher Colin's coded notes and reveal a paper trail of corruption.

Characters in The Detective

Major characters
 Detective Joe Leland - A private detective, he investigates the supposed suicide of Colin MacIver per Norma's request. During his investigation, he uncovers corruption, fraud, lies, and a shocking connection to a case he solved while working on the police force.
 Karen Leland - Joe's wife.
 Dr. Wendell Roberts - A psychiatrist.
 Colin MacIver - A troubled man, murder or suicide victim.
 Norma MacIver - Colin's widow.

Minor characters
 Mike Petrakis
 Teddy Leikman
 Felix Tesla
 Dave Schoenstein
 Curran
 Florence
 Mrs. MacIver
 Betty Kaminsky
 Murray Kaminsky

Release details

1966, Dial Press, hardcover, 
April 1, 1986, Delta, paperback, 
July 1987, Amereon Ltd, hardcover,

References

1966 American novels
American thriller novels
Die Hard
American novels adapted into films
American detective novels